The WSL World Light Heavyweight Championship was a title in the Wrestling Superstars Live promotion. It was originally known as the AWA Superstars of Wrestling World Light Heavyweight Championship.

Title history

See also
AWA World Light Heavyweight Championship, original version.

References
wrestlingsuperstarslive.com

World professional wrestling championships
Light heavyweight wrestling championships
Wrestling Superstars Live